The News and Star (formerly the Evening News and Star and Cumberland Evening News) is a local tabloid newspaper in Cumbria. As of 18 October 2018, it belongs to Newsquest who produce several regional newspapers throughout the UK.

The newspaper is published every day from Monday to Saturday and is available throughout North and West Cumbria and parts of Southern Scotland.

In 2005 it had a daily circulation of approximately 25,084 copies (Jul–Dec 2005), however that had dropped to 6,611 by 2018, and just over 2,300 by March 2023.

References

External links

Newsquest official website

Newspapers published in Cumbria
Newspapers established in 1910
Daily newspapers published in the United Kingdom
1910 establishments in England